Natalie Schafer (November 5, 1900 – April 10, 1991) was an American actress, known for her role as Lovey Howell on the sitcom Gilligan's Island (1964–1967).

Early life and career

Natalie Schafer was born on November 5, 1900, in Manhattan. the eldest of the three children of Jennie (née Tim; family name originally Tein) and Charles Emanual Schafer, both of German-Jewish descent.

Schafer began her career as an actress on Broadway before moving to Los Angeles in 1941 to work in films. She appeared on Broadway in 17 plays between 1927 and 1959, often playing supporting roles. Most of those appearances were in short-run plays, with the exceptions of Lady in the Dark (1941–42), The Doughgirls (1942–44), and Romanoff and Juliet (1957–58). She was seen in a revival of Six Characters in Search of an Author, directed by Sir Tyrone Guthrie (1955–56). She also appeared in stock and regional productions, including the off-Broadway production The Killing of Sister George with Claire Trevor in the title role. She also guest-starred in TV productions beginning in the 1950s, such as an episode (“The Shy Ballerina”) of Sherlock Holmes, and in "The Charm School" episode of I Love Lucy, both in 1954.

Schafer performed in many films, usually portraying sophisticates. On TV, her roles included "Lovey Howell" on Gilligan's Island. She reprised her role in made-for-television spin-off films after the show ended, along with the animated spinoff Gilligan's Planet in 1982.

In 1969, Schafer appeared in The Survivors—a high-profile prime time soap opera aired by the ABC television network. Despite the presence of movie stars like Lana Turner, Kevin McCarthy and George Hamilton, the show was a ratings failure and lasted only one season.  For the 1971-1972 television season, Schafer joined the cast of the CBS daytime-serial, Search for Tomorrow, portraying Helen Collins, mother of Wade and Clay Collins. Immediately following that role, she played Augusta Roulland on another daytime soap, Love of Life. Her final performance was in the 1990 made-for-television horror film I'm Dangerous Tonight.

She guest-starred as well on many other television series, including Goodyear Playhouse/Philco Playhouse ("The Sisters", with Grace Kelly, 1951), I Love Lucy (1954), Producers' Showcase ("The Petrified Forest", 1955), Guestward, Ho! (1960), The Beverly Hillbillies (1964), Mayberry RFD (1970), Mannix (1972), The Brady Bunch (1974), Three's Company, The Love Boat, and Phyllis (1976).

Personal life

Schafer was married to actor Louis Calhern from 1933 to 1942; they had no children. Schafer and Calhern appeared together in the 1956 film Forever, Darling.

Schafer was secretive about her age. She reportedly never revealed her true year of birth to her husband during their marriage. For many years, her birth year was generally given as 1912. Few people believed this; yet her actual year of birth of 1900 (which was not discovered until after her death) surprised even her intimate friends. She was reportedly also a breast cancer survivor, which she withheld from her fans and friends.

At the time of her death, a family spokesman stated that Schafer's survivors included her longtime companion Maurice Hill.

Death
Schafer died of liver cancer in her Beverly Hills home at the age of 90. She was cremated; her ashes were scattered into the Pacific Ocean, off San Pedro's Point Fermin Light. She bequeathed between $1.5 million and $2 million to the Lillian Booth Actors Home to renovate the hospital's outpatient wing, which was renamed the Natalie Schafer Wing in 1993.

Partial filmography

 The Body Disappears (1941) – Mrs. Lunceford
 Reunion in France (1942) – Frau Amy Schroder 
 Marriage Is a Private Affair (1944) – Mrs. Irene Selworth
 Keep Your Powder Dry (1945) – Harriet Corwin
 Molly and Me (1945) – Kitty Goode-Burroughs
 Wonder Man (1945) – Mrs. Hume
 Masquerade in Mexico (1945) – Irene Denny
 The Other Love (1947) – Dora Shelton
 Dishonored Lady (1947) – Ethel Royce
 Repeat Performance (1947) – Eloise Shaw
 Secret Beyond the Door (1947) – Edith Potter
 The Time of Your Life (1948) – Society Lady
 The Snake Pit (1948) – Mrs. Stuart
 Caught (1949) – Dorothy Dale
 Payment on Demand (1951) – Mrs. Edna Blanton
 Take Care of My Little Girl (1951) – Mother Cookie Clark
 The Law and the Lady (1951) – Pamela Pemberson
 Callaway Went Thataway (1951) – Martha Lorrison
 Just Across the Street (1952) – Gertrude Medford
 The Girl Next Door (1953) – Evelyn the maid
 Casanova's Big Night (1954) – Signora Foressi
 Female on the Beach (1955) – Queenie Sorenson
 Forever, Darling (1956) – Millie Opdyke
 Anastasia (1956) – Irina Lissemskaia
 Oh, Men! Oh, Women! (1957) – Mrs. Day
 Bernardine (1957) – Mrs. Madge Beaumont
 Back Street (1961) – Mrs. Evans
 Susan Slade (1961) – Marion Corbett
 Route 66 (1962) - Emily Bridenbaugh
 40 Carats (1973) – Mrs. Adams
 The Day of the Locust (1975) – Audrey Jennings
 Beverly Hills Brats (1989) – Lillian
 I'm Dangerous Tonight (1990) – Grandmother

References

External links

 
 
 
 
 

1900 births
1991 deaths
20th-century American actresses
Actresses from New York City
American people of German-Jewish descent
American film actresses
American stage actresses
American television actresses
Deaths from liver cancer
Deaths from cancer in California
People from Red Bank, New Jersey
Jewish American actresses
20th-century American Jews